Rich Kleiman (born November 27, 1976) is an American entrepreneur. A native New Yorker, he is Kevin Durant’s longtime manager as well as co-founder and business partner with Durant in 35V (Thirty Five Ventures). Founded in 2016, 35V incorporates Kleiman and Durant's business entities, including Durant’s personal brand marketing portfolio and on-court contracts, an investment portfolio and the sports business media network Boardroom. Forbes has called Kleiman a visionary with an "established track records in starting companies, investing in emerging brands and in disrupting existing markets."

Career

35V (Thirty Five Ventures) 
Kleiman's early years at 35V included investments in more than 100 companies, including digital sports network Overtime, digital currency platform Coinbase, spare change app Acorns, delivery company Postmates and NBA Top Shot by Dapper Labs. Under Kleiman, 35V started investing in emerging sports teams such as Philadelphia Union and Gotham FC, as well as sports leagues including Premier Lacrosse League and Athletes Unlimited Volleyball.

35V's flagship project is Boardroom, a media network that covers the business of sports, entertainment and culture. Boardroom was launched in 2019 and includes editorial, video, social media content, daily newsletters and podcasts by Kleiman and Durant.

Kleiman and Durant media projects under the Boardroom umbrella include the Academy Award-winning Two Distant Strangers (Netflix), the scripted series Swagger (by Apple TV+) and the 2022 Showtime documentary NYC Point Gods.

Roc Nation Sports 
In 2013, Kleiman helped launch Roc Nation Sports, where he served as Vice President of the sports agency founded by Jay-Z. He worked with athletes such as Victor Cruz, CC Sabathia, Skylar Diggins-Smith and Robinson Cano. Kleiman started with Roc Nation in 2008 as a music manager representing artists, DJs and producers such as D Nice, Mark Ronson, Solange, Wale and Meek Mill. Kleiman's career in entertainment began at Radical Media, where he was a music supervisor, as well as a producer on projects such as Jay-Z's feature-length documentary Fade To Black.

Personal life
Kleiman married Jana Ilyse Gold in November 2003. They have two children. Kleiman's family resides in Manhattan, New York, where he grew up.

References

External links 

 Interview on Forbes
Profile on Bloomberg

1976 births
Living people
Sports managers
American businesspeople
Businesspeople from New York City
American sports agents